The national flag of Sweden consists of a yellow or gold Nordic cross (i.e. a horizontal cross extending to the edges, with the crossbar closer to the hoist than the fly) on a field of light blue. The Nordic cross design traditionally represents Christianity. The design and colours of the Swedish flag are believed to have been inspired by the present coat of arms of Sweden of 1442, which is blue divided quarterly by a cross pattée of gold, and modelled on the Danish flag. Blue and yellow have been used as Swedish colours at least since Magnus III's royal coat of arms of 1275.

Specifics

Ratio and colour scheme

The Swedish flag is one of only five that use the ratio 5:8, the others being Argentina, Guatemala, Palau, and Poland.

It is one of only four flags that currently use the colour scheme of blue and yellow, the others being Kazakhstan, Palau, and Ukraine.

State flag and civil ensign 

The dimensions of the Swedish flag are 5:2:9 horizontally and 4:2:4 vertically. The dimensions of the Swedish flag with a triple-tail are 5:2:5:8 horizontally and 4:2:4 vertically. The colours of the flag are officially established through the Natural Color System to be NCS 0580-Y10R for the shade of yellow, and NCS 4055-R95B for the shade of blue. They are also specified to Pantone PMS 301 C/U for blue and PMS 116 or PMS 109 U for yellow. The square-cut Swedish state flag is identical to the civil ensign. The Swedish law does not regulate the design of the Swedish pennant, but it is recommended that its colour scheme should correspond with that of the flag.

Naval ensign 

The triple-tailed flag is used as a naval ensign. Its overall ratio, including the tails, is 1:2. The flag is also used as the Swedish naval jack. The jacks are smaller than the ensigns, but they have the same proportions. The Swedish swallowtail flag was originally the King's personal emblem, or the emblem representing a command conferred by the King. It was at first two-pointed, but by the mid-17th century, the distinctive swallowtail with tongue appeared. The flag is also flown by the defence ministry, while civil ministries fly square flags.

Sovereign's flag 

The Swedish royal flag is identical to the triple-tailed naval ensign, but has in its centre a white field with the greater or the lesser coat of arms surrounded by the Order of the Seraphim, which has the king as its grand master. The king personally decides about the specific use of the royal flag.

History

Mythology

According to early modern legend, the 12th-century King Eric IX saw a golden cross in the sky as he landed in Finland during the First Swedish Crusade in 1157.  Seeing this as a sign from God he adopted the golden cross against a blue background as his banner.

It has been suggested that the Swedish origin legend is chosen to counter a parallel origin story for the Danish flag, also recorded in the 16th century.
According to this theory, the Swedish flag was created during the reign of King Charles VIII, who also introduced the coat of arms of Sweden in 1442. The national coat of arms is a combination of King Albert's coat of arms of 1364 and King Magnus III's coat of arms of 1275, and is blue divided quarterly by a golden cross pattée.

Other historians claim that the Swedish flag was blue with a white cross before 1420, and became blue with a golden cross only during the early reign King Gustav I, who deposed King Christian II in 1521.

Early history 

The exact age of the Swedish flag is not known, but the oldest recorded pictures of a blue cloth with a yellow cross date from the early 16th century, during the reign of King Gustav I. The first legal description of the flag was made in a royal warrant of 19 April 1562 as "yellow in a cross fashioned on blue". As stipulated in a royal warrant of 1569, the yellow cross was always to be borne on Swedish battle standards and banners. Prior to this, a similar flag appeared in the coat of arms of King John III's duchy, which is today Southwest Finland. The same coat of arms is still used by the province.

Triple-tailed flag 

A royal warrant of 6 November 1663, regulated the use of the triple-tailed flag, to be used only as a state flag and naval ensign. According to the same royal warrant, merchant ships were only allowed to fly square-cut city flags in their respective provincial colours. In practice, however, the merchant fleet began using a square-cut civil ensign of the state flag. In a government instruction of ship building of 1730, this civil ensign should have the same proportions and colors as the state flag, with the notable difference of being square-cut. In 1756, the use of pennants by private ships was prohibited.

Blue ensign 
A royal warrant of 18 August 1761, stipulated that an all blue triple-tailed flag to be used by the archipelago fleet, a branch of the army tasked with defending the archipelago along the Swedish coastlines. The commander of the fleet also had the right to order the use of the ordinary war ensign instead of the blue ensign when that was "appropriate". The blue flag was used until 1813.

Union between Sweden and Norway

Union flags of 1815 and 1818

On 6 June 1815, a common military ensign was introduced for the two united kingdoms of Sweden and Norway. This flag was identical to the former triple-tailed military ensign of Sweden, with a white saltire on red to be included in the canton. Proposed by the Norwegian Prime Minister and unionist Peder Anker, the white saltire on a red background was supposed to symbolise Norway, as the country had previously been united with Denmark and initially continued to use the same flag as an independent country, but with the national arms in the canton.

Norwegian ships continued to use the Danish civil ensign distinguished with the national arms in the canton north of Cape Finisterre, but had to fly the Swedish civil ensign in the Mediterranean to be protected from pirate attacks. A common civil ensign for both countries was introduced in 1818, on the pattern of the naval ensign, but square-cut. This flag was optional for Swedish vessels, but compulsory for Norwegian ones in distant waters. In 1821, Norway adopted a new national civil ensign, identical to the present flag of Norway.

Following the adoption of a separate Norwegian flag, a royal regulation of 17 July 1821, stipulated that ships of both kingdoms use the common square-cut civil ensign (with the saltire included) in "distant waters" (i.e. beyond Cape Finisterre).  In "distant waters", they had the right to use any of the square-cut civil ensigns of their respective countries, or the uniform Union civil ensign. This system was in force until 1838.

Union flags of 1844 

A royal resolution of 20 June 1844, introduced new flags and heraldry to denote the equal status of the two kingdoms within the union. Both countries were granted civil and military ensigns on the same pattern, their respective national flags with the addition of a union mark in the canton, combining the flag colours of both countries. The naval ensign was based on the traditional triple-tailed Swedish model. In addition, the new union mark was to be used as the naval jack and as the flag for the common diplomatic representations abroad. The warrant also stipulated that the merchant fleet use their respective countries' square-cut civil ensigns, including the new union mark. Also, royal ensigns were introduced for both countries, their respective naval ensigns with the union mark, with the addition of the union arms at the center of the cross.
The new union flags were well received by the Norwegians, who had demanded their own military ensign since the union was formed. In Sweden, however, the new union mark in particular became quite unpopular and was contemptuously nicknamed the Sillsallaten (Swedish) or Sildesalaten (Norwegian) after a colorful dish of pickled herring, decorated with red beets and apples in a radial pattern. It is believed that the name was first used in a speech by Lord Brakel in the Swedish House of Lords in Stockholm.

During the 19th century, a number of regulations were issued regarding the use of Swedish flags.  The military ensign was also to be used by civil government ships and buildings, such as the Customs, Harbor pilots and the Royal Mail. For this use, the military ensign would have a white field included with a golden marker: For the Harbor pilots (as of 1881, based on a proposal of 1825) an anchor with a star; for the Customs (as of 1844) the letter "T" topped a royal crown; for the Royal Mail (as of 1844) a postal horn with a royal crown. On 7 May 1897, an alternate state flag was introduced. This double-tailed flag was used by government owned ships and buildings, which did not fly the triple-tailed military ensign.

During the late 19th century, increasing Norwegian dissatisfaction with the union led to the demand for a return to the "pure" flag of 1821 without the union mark. Opponents of the union began to use this flag several years before it was officially recognised. During the 1890s, two consecutive sessions of the Norwegian parliament voted to abolish the mark, but the decision was overruled by royal veto. However, in 1898, when the flag law was passed for the third time, the king had to sanction it. On 12 October 1899, the union mark was removed from the Norwegian civil ensign. As the Norwegian military ensign according to the constitution of 1814 was to be a union ensign, the union mark remained on military flags until the dissolution of the union with Sweden. "Pure" military ensigns were hoisted on fortresses and naval vessels on 9 June 1905.

The union mark, however, remained a part of the Swedish flag until 1905, when a Law of 28 October 1905, stipulated the removal of the union mark as of 1 November 1905.

Colour change in 1906 

Following the dissolution of the union in 1905, the triple-tailed naval ensign also became the Swedish naval jack, replacing the common naval jack, and the Flag law of 22 June 1906 further regulated the use and design of the flag, specifying the colours to be "ljust mellanblå" (light medium blue) and "guldgul" (golden yellow), a departure from the previously darker shade of blue. The Swedish state flag became identical to the square-cut civil ensign, and all private use of the triple-tailed ensign was prohibited.

Royal flag

The king and queen use a royal flag with the greater national coat of arms. Other members of the royal house use a royal flag with the lesser national coat of arms. On naval ships the flag of the king is raised together with a split pennant with the greater national coat of arms. Likewise the flag of the heir apparent is raised together with a split pennant with the lesser national coat of arms on naval ships.

The Swedish Marshal of the Realm (Riksmarskalken) has published a series of decisions regarding the royal flag of Sweden. In a decision of 6 April 1987, rules are defined on how to fly the royal flag at the Royal Palace of Stockholm.
 The royal flag with the greater national coat of arms is hoisted at the Royal Palace when H.M. the King is within the realm, and is upholding his duties as the Head of state.
 The royal flag with the lesser national coat of arms is hoisted at the Royal Palace, if by reason of illness, foreign travel or for any other cause, the King is unavoidably prevented from performing his duties; a member of the Royal House under the valid order of succession who is not prevented there from, assumes and performs the duties of the Head of State in the capacity of Regent ad interim.
 The "plain" triple-tailed flag (without the coat of arms) is flown at the Royal Palace when the Riksdag has appointed a person to serve, at a Government order, as Regent ad interim when no member of the Royal House under the valid order of succession is in a position to serve. The three-tailed war flag is also flown at the Royal Palace when the Speaker, or, in his unavoidable absence, one of the Deputy Speakers, serves, at a Government order, as Regent ad interim when no member of the Royal House under the valid order of succession is in a position to serve.

Under King Carl XVI Gustaf, king since 1973, the plain triple-tailed flag has flown at the Royal Palace only once. This occurred on 2–3 July 1988, when the King went on a private visit to Wuppertal, Germany; at the same time, the Duke of Halland, his uncle and the only person in the line of succession, was on a private visit to Sainte-Maxime, France. The government therefore ordered the speaker of the Riksdag, Ingemund Bengtsson, to serve as regent ad interim for two days.

Private use of the state flag
There have been a few notable exemptions regarding the prohibition of private parties to use the state flag. All these privileges were terminated in accordance with the new specific flag regulation of 22 June 1906.
 According to a royal warrant of 31 October 1786, the Swedish East India Company had the right to use the triple-tailed war ensign in "Indian waters", when not being under immediate protection by the Swedish navy. In the merchant fleet, there was a common practice to illegally use the war ensign to indicate that the ship was armed.
 In 1838, it was decided that private ships contracted by the Royal Mail were to fly a double-tailed flag.
 On 27 February 1832, the Royal Swedish Yacht Club received the right to use the triple-tailed war ensign, including a centre white field with a golden "O" topped with a duke's crown (as of 1878 a royal crown).
 On 7 June 1893, the Royal Gothenburg Yacht Club received the right to use the triple-tailed military ensign, including a centered white field with the golden "G K S S" topped with a star.

Use outside Sweden

The flag of Sweden appears in coat of arms of Finland's province Southwest Finland.

The flag of Wilmington, Delaware in the United States is modelled after the Swedish flag in remembrance of the short-lived colony of New Sweden, with the cross affixed with the seal of the city. The flag of Philadelphia, Pennsylvania, which also lies within historic New Sweden, is a vertical triband rather than a Nordic Cross, but the blue and yellow colours of the flag were chosen to commemorate the Swedish settlement of the region. The flag of Verona (Italy) resembles the flag of Sweden in colours and features. The former flag has a symmetric yellow cross, although the similarities between the two flags may be historically unrelated. 
According to a legend, the Argentine football team, Boca Juniors' flag and colours were inspired by the flag of Sweden.

The seal of the Municipal Council of Shanghai International Settlement incorporated the 1844 Swedish civil ensign.

Rules for displaying the Swedish flag

When used from a stand-alone flagpole, the size of the flag is recommended to have a width equalling a fourth of the height of the pole. When used from a flagpole extending from a building, the flag is recommended to have a width equalling a third of the height (length) of the pole.

The times and rules for raising and lowering the Swedish flag are as follows:
 Between 1 March and 31 October the flag can be raised from 08.00 am.
 Between 1 November and 28/29 February the flag can be raised from 09.00 am.
 The flag shall be taken down at sunset but at the latest 09.00 pm.
 If the flag is illuminated, it may remain up even after the sun has set.

If the flag is no longer in presentable condition it should be discarded by burning in a respectful manner or returned to the manufacturer for disposal.

Private citizens are not obliged to fly the flag on official flag flying days, but they are encouraged to do it. Apart from the flag flying days in Sweden, everyone is of course able to hoist the flag whenever there is a reason for celebration in the family or otherwise.

Construction Sheet

See also

Coat of arms of Sweden
Flag flying days in Sweden
List of flags of Sweden
Nordic cross flag
Union mark of Norway and Sweden

References

External links

 
 Flag of Sweden – Riksarkivet

National flags
 
Flag
Nordic Cross flags
1663 introductions
Sweden
Sweden
Flags of the Arctic